The Zozobra (also known as "Old Man Gloom")  is a giant marionette effigy constructed of wood, wire and cotton cloth that is built and burned prior to the annual Fiestas de Santa Fe in Santa Fe, New Mexico, United States.

As its name suggests, it embodies gloom and anxiety; by burning it, people destroy the worries and troubles of the previous year in the flames. Anyone with an excess of gloom is encouraged to write down the nature of their gloom on a slip of paper and leave it in the "gloom box" found in City of Santa Fe Visitors' Centers in the weeks leading up to the burn. Participants can also add documents on the day of the burning, up until 8 pm MT, at a "gloom tent" in the venue where they can add to the marionette's stuffing. Legal papers, divorce documents, mortgage pay-offs, parking tickets and even a wedding dress –– all have found their way into Zozobra to go up in smoke. At the festival, glooms from the gloom box are placed at Zozobra's feet to be burned alongside it.

History
Fiestas de Santa Fe has been held since 1712 to celebrate the Spanish reconquest of the city in 1692 by Don Diego de Vargas from the Pueblo tribes who had occupied the city since the Pueblo Revolt of 1680. The burning of Zozobra dates from 1924, when artist William Howard Shuster, Jr. burned the first Zozobra in his backyard at a party for his friends and fellow artists. "Zozobra" is a Spanish word for anxiety, worry, or sinking and was chosen by Shuster and newspaper editor E. Dana Johnson after a trip they made to Mexico. It is said that the idea was influenced by Mexican cartonería (papier-mâché sculpture), specifically the effigies exploded during the burning of Judas that takes place on Holy Saturday or New Year's Eve, as a way of ridding oneself or one's community of evil.

Modern celebration

Each year in Santa Fe New Mexico, over 60,000 people attend the event. The Friday Burning of Zozobra is followed by festive events over the Labor Day weekend, with Desfile de Los Niños, the Children's Pet Parade on Saturday, the Hysterical-historical Parade on Sunday, and a traditional mass at St. Francis Cathedral on Sunday night.

Since receiving all rights to the Zozobra pageant in 1964 from creator Will Shuster, the Kiwanis Club of Santa Fe has built Zozobra and burned the effigy at Fort Marcy Park.

The Burning of Zozobra at Fort Marcy Park in Santa Fe, New Mexico was traditionally held in September; however, ticket sales in advance of the event improved in 2014 when it was moved to the Friday immediately before Labor Day.

Event description 
Once nightfall arrives fire dancers come out to perform. A "fire spirit dancer" also comes out dressed in red with a headdress and carrying two flaming torches, symbolizing Old Man Gloom's arch enemy. She is accompanied by the small "glooms," which are children dressed in white, dancing alongside her. The fire dancer's role is to scare away her little companions, as she represents the light that sends away the gloom and bad energy of the year. As the dancers perform on stage, Zozobra's arms and head begin to move and he lets out groans. After the dance is completed, the marionette is set on fire via attached fireworks. Once the marionette collapses, more fireworks are set off. Representing the goodness and light called forth to battle the gloom and bad energy of the year, the Fire Spirit dancers in front of Zozobra and prepares to do battle with the gloomy monster. As the Fire Spirit dances, Zozobra's arms and head begin to move and he begins to groan and growl in rage. The marionette is set on fire via fireworks. Once the effigy collapses, a fireworks display concludes the event.

List of Zozobra-burning events

Gallery

See also

 Burning Man
 Burning of Judas
 Wicker man
 Pappanji

References

 Zozobra: The Story of Old Man Gloom, Jennifer Owings Dewey; photographed by Jeanie Pulsen Fleming, Santa Fe: University of New Mexico Press, 2004

External links

 The Burning of Zozobra - official site
 Santa Fe Fiesta Council - official Santa Fe Fiesta site
 Video of Zozobra burning, 2005 - The Santa Fe New Mexican

Culture of Santa Fe, New Mexico
Festivals in New Mexico
Recurring events established in 1924